Brushgrove is a small state suburb/village on the north coast of New South Wales, it is located at the point of the Clarence river where it splits up into two arms named the North and South arm. Located out about 1 km north of Cowper and about 7 km southwest of Lawrence.  Brushgrove has a cricket pitch, sports field, pub, and park.

Population
In the 2016 Census, there were 199 people in Brushgrove.  88.7% of people were born in Australia and 94.3% of people only spoke English at home.

References

External links
 http://www.clarence.nsw.gov.au/content/FPS/Photos/Flood/Full/FPS_F_brushgrove.jpg

Towns in New South Wales